Sathit Bensoh (born 9 January 1976) is a Thai football manager and a former footballer.

Early life 
Bensoh was born on 9 January 1976 in Hat Yai, Songkhla.

Managerial career
Sathit has worked with Bangkok Glass, Hatyai, Pattani, Trang and Satun United in Thailand. In December 2016, Sathit signed a contract with Malaysian club Kelantan as an assistant coach.

Kelantan
Sathit started his work at Kelantan as first assistant coach to Zahasmi Ismail in December 2016. On 12 October 2017, Sathit was appointed as interim coach for the Kelantan. His first match as interim head coach was in a 1–3 win over Melaka United on 28 October 2017.

On 7 December 2017, Sathit has been appointed as Kelantan's first team head coach.

On 15 January 2018, his contract has been terminated after the first three matches of 2018 Malaysia Super League, which Kelantan drew 1 game and lost 2 games.

Managerial statistics

References

1976 births
Living people
Sathit Bensoh
Sathit Bensoh
Association footballers not categorized by position
Sathit Bensoh